Stephen Franklin Jackson (born December 8, 1942, in McKinney, Texas) is a former American football linebacker in the National Football League for the Washington Redskins. He played college football at the University of Texas at Arlington.

References

1942 births
Living people
American football linebackers
People from McKinney, Texas
Texas–Arlington Mavericks football players
Washington Redskins players